Chandradasan (born December 1958) is an Indian theatre director, actor, writer, and translator from Kerala, India.

Early life and education
Chandradasan worked with rural theatre groups like Gramavedi Vallarpadam, Bhasabheri Thripunithura and directed plays including Theruvujadha, Rajavinte Chenda which were performed widely all over Kerala launched him as a noteworthy theatre person in the state.

Lokadharmi Theatre Group
Chandradasan is the founder of Lokadharmi Theatre Group and Mazhavillu, a children's theatre group, both based in Kochi, Kerala, India.

Non-theatrical contributions
He was the director board member of RRC, Bangalore of NSD. and was a professor in chemistry at St. Albert's College, Ernakulam. He has also done notable roles in few films.

Directorial works

Acting credits

References

External links
 

1958 births
Living people
20th-century Indian dramatists and playwrights
Indian theatre directors
Malayalam-language dramatists and playwrights